Isaac Edward Morse (May 22, 1809 – February 11, 1866) was a United States Congressman from Louisiana and Attorney General of Louisiana. He was born in Attakapas, Louisiana.

Biography
Morse attended school in Elizabethtown, New Jersey, and the Norwich Military Academy in Norwich, Vermont. He graduated from Harvard University in 1829. He studied law and was admitted to the bar and practiced in New Orleans, Louisiana, and St. Martinville, Louisiana, from 1835 to 1842. In 1842, he was elected to the Louisiana State Senate, serving through 1844. He was then elected to the United States Congress as a Democrat to fill the vacancy created by the death of Peter E. Bossier. He was reelected to the Twenty-ninth, Thirtieth, and Thirty-first Congresses and served from December 2, 1844, to March 3, 1851. He was the chairman, Committee on Private Land Claims during the Thirty-first Congress. He also served as a delegate to the 1848 Democratic National Convention. In 1850, he was an unsuccessful candidate for reelection, defeated by John Moore (Whig).

In 1854, he became the attorney general of Louisiana, serving in that capacity through 1856. He was appointed by President Franklin Pierce on December 2, 1856, as one of two special commissioners to New Granada to negotiate concerning the transit of citizens, officers, soldiers, and seamen of the United States across the Isthmus of Panama. He died in New Orleans, Louisiana, on February 11, 1866. He is buried in Washington Cemetery.

References

1809 births
1866 deaths
Harvard University alumni
Louisiana Attorneys General
Democratic Party Louisiana state senators
Democratic Party members of the United States House of Representatives from Louisiana
19th-century American politicians
People from Elizabeth, New Jersey